Vernon Dean Crawford, Jr. (born June 25, 1974) is a former American football linebacker. He played three seasons in the National Football League (NFL) with the New England Patriots, who drafted him out of Florida State in 1997.

Crawford attended the City College of San Francisco and then was a two-year starter at Florida State. A fifth-round draft selection in 1997, he was employed by the Patriots primarily as a special teams performer and had his most productive season in 1998 when he posted 13 tackles as a linebacker and 14 stops on special teams. He left the Patriots and was signed by the Green Bay Packers in July 2000, but spent all of the season on the injured reserve list.

After a few seasons in minor football leagues, Crawford retired as a player and turned to coaching, first at Randolph High School, then at Curry College. He coached the Boston Militia women's football team, which won three national titles, and continues to coach the Boston Renegades women's team. He is also the head football coach at Seekonk High School, where he led the Warriors to sectional finals appearance in 2016.

References 

1974 births
Living people
American football linebackers
City College of San Francisco Rams football players
Florida State Seminoles football players
New England Patriots players
Green Bay Packers players
New York/New Jersey Hitmen players